12 rating refers to a type of age-based content rating that applies to media entertainment, such as films, television shows and computer games. The following articles document the rating across a range of countries and mediums:

Classification organizations
 Brazilian advisory rating system (12)
 British Board of Film Classification (12 and 12A)
 Central Board of Film Certification (UA – 12 equivalent)
 Common Sense Media (12+)
 Computer Entertainment Rating Organization (B – 12 equivalent)
 Dirección General de Radio, Televisión y Cinematografía (B – 12 equivalent)
 Eirin (PG-12)
 Freiwillige Selbstkontrolle der Filmwirtschaft (12)
 Irish Film Classification Office (12 and 12A)
 Korea Media Rating Board (12)
 National Audiovisual Institute (Finland) (12)
 National Bureau of Classification (NBC) (12+)
 Netherlands Institute for the Classification of Audiovisual Media (12)
 Norwegian Media Authority (12)
 Pan European Game Information (12)
 Unterhaltungssoftware Selbstkontrolle (12)
 General Commission for Audiovisual Media (Saudi Arabia) (12+)

Systems
 Motion picture content rating system, a range of classification systems for films that commonly use the age 12 as part of its regulatory criteria
 Television content rating system, a range of classification systems for television broadcasts that commonly use the age 12 as part of its regulatory criteria
 Video game content rating system, a range of classification systems for video games that commonly use the age 12 as part of its regulatory criteria
 Mobile software content rating system, a range of classification systems for mobile software that commonly use the age 12 as part of its regulatory criteria

See also
 12A (disambiguation)
 History of British film certificates (PG-12)
 Censorship in France